Nexus grammar is a system of analysing text which was first used in Denmark. It was a system that was heavily advanced by the Danish Linguist Otto Jespersen. It most often refers to the relationship between the action and the subject in the sentence. This system has been developed to include symbols for most parts of speech.

Examples
  The ball dropped.
       X     O

The X in the sentence refers to the subject while the O refers to the action.

  The boy is happy
       X  O   (x)

The X and O are still the same but the brackets round the (x) tell the reader it is the subject's predicate.

References 

 
 

Grammar
Parts of speech